Josse van Aertrycke (Bruges, 1451 — Azores, after 1 June 1546) was a Flemish nobleman from Bruges, who settled in Faial, Azores, in the end of the 15th century. He was probably invited by Joost De Hurtere, the first captain-major of the island, and was possibly an associate of his merchant company. His surname derives from the town of Aartrijke, one of his family lordships until 1396. According to Gaspar Frutuoso, Josse van Aertrycke received various favors and concessions from Joost De Hurtere for the establishment of his settlement in Faial.

Biography 

Van Aertrycke was one of the first settlers of Faial, his lands were located between Ribeira da Conceição and the slopes of Espalamanca.

Some of the factors that led the Flemish to immigrate during the 15th century include a series of succession wars, the struggle for the centralization of power in the Burgundian Netherlands and the extreme poverty during the reign of Philip the Good, and that of his son, Charles the Bold.

One of the main reasons which attracted the Flemish to the Azores was the commercial alliance between Flanders and Portugal that dated from beginning of the Portuguese nation. At this time, Flanders was an important trade center in Europe. In addition, many Flemish settlers immigrated to the Azores when Philip the Good married Infanta Isabella of Portugal, daughter of King John I and a sister of Prince Henry, the Navigator. In the section referring to the Azores, we find this passage from the Nuremberg Globe of Martin Behaim (1492): "the aforementioned islands were colonized in the year 1466, when, after much deliberation, the king of Portugal ceded them to his sister, Isabella, Duchess of Burgundy, Countess of Flanders."

Josse van Aertrycke was the firstborn son of Jan van Aertrycke d. 1468, a notable and orator of the prévôté of Bruges, and his wife, Barbara Ferteyns. The van Aertryckes were an old family of poorters and burgomasters of Bruges, and feudal lords of Tillegem castle. Josse's paternal grand-father, Jacob (d. 3 September 1405), participated in the great tournament of Bruges under the n. 71 in 1393, and so did his ancestor, Philippe I, (Jacob's grand-father) and the latter's brother, Lodewijk, both in 1391, under the numbers 35 and 36, respectively.

In the Azores, the noble origin of van Aertrycke was first attested by Gaspar Frutuoso in his description of Faial: "there are several members of the nobility in the village of Horta, for instance, Jos Dutra (Joost De Hurtere), the donatary captain, and Guilherme da Silveira (Willem De Kersemakere) and Jos daTerra (Josse van Aertrycke)." Also, according to the Azorean historian, Marcelino Lima, van Aertrycke “was a distinguished individual, most likely coming from an ancient lineage. That is corroborated by his marriage to Margarida da Silveira, daughter of the illustrious Flemming, Guilherme da Silveira (De Kersemakere), the reputed grandson of a count, who possessed his own family arms." As a matter of fact, Josse descended from William I, Count of Holland, from the House of Borselen, and the (currently) comital family, van Maldeghem, whose escutcheon was added to the shield of his collateral relative (Lodewijk) in 1391.

There is indication that van Aertrycke or one of his descendants brought his family arms to the Azores (fig. 2) a black escutcheon with six golden pitchers. This coat of arms was probably granted to Simon van Aertrycke, the Elder, Lord of Tillegem (fl. 1331) in the mid 1340/50s in Flanders, and brought to Portugal by Josse in the 15th century. So far, it has not been possible to verify when it started to be used in Portugal.

If Josse himself brought his coat of arms from Flanders, he would have registered it in the Chapel of Our Lady of Conception, which was built soon after his arrival in Faial. The chapel, however, was ransacked in 1589 by the English, and then burned down during another English invasion in 1597. The destruction of this church probably eliminated any traces of the history of these family arms in Portugal.

Marriage and posterity 
On 1 June 1545, Josse van Aertrycke received a majorat from the Portuguese crown. Van Aertrycke married Margaretha van der Haegen De Kersemakere, daughter of Willem De Kersemakere, b. 1452 in Bruges and d. 1529 in the parish of Flamengos (also where their wedding ceremony was conducted). In the Azores, their offspring was sometimes known by Margaretha's maternal surname, 'van der Haegen', translated into Portuguese as 'da Silveira':

 Jan van Aertrycke ( — after 26 May 1573), married to Catharina De Bruyn, only daughter of the Dutch settler from Maastricht, Willem De Bruyn d. 1553, and his wife, Violante, a granddaughter of the Scottish knight Sir John Drummond of Stobhall, and a great-niece of Queen Annabella of Scotland. Both he and his wife are buried in Madeira;
 Emanuel van Aertrycke (  — c. 1583), sole heir to his father's majorat, married to his cousin, D. Isabel da Silveira Pereira, daughter of Tristão Martins Pereira and maternal grand-daughter of Willem De Kersemakere;
 Josse van Aertrycke, the Younger (  — c. 1590), married to D. Maria de Pórras, daughter of Tomás de Pórras, the Elder, and his wife, Isabella De Hurtere. Maria was a maternal grand-daughter of the Flemming Antonius Cornelis and Christina De Hurtere, a niece of Joost De Hurture, through the latter's illegitimate brother, Boudewijn;
 Frans van Aertycke, died young;
 Barbara van Aertrycke, married to Antoon De Bruyn, the Elder, d. after 19 July 1585, son of Willem De Bruyn and his wife, Violante;
 Catharina van Aertrycke (  — Horta, 1568), married to Diogo Gomes of Graciosa, d. 1565. She willed the sum of 7,000 reis to her children;
 Antoon van Aertrycke, priest ordained in the church of Horta. He left all his earthly possessions to his brother Josse; he is buried in Graciosa.

References 

 Notes

 Sources

 
 L. Fr. Claeys, André (2011). Vlaamse Adel op de Azoren sinds de 15de eeuw, Volume IV. Bruges, Belgium.
 
 Clemmensen, Steen (2010). Tournament in Bruges held 11th March 1393, led by Jean d'Aa Sr. de Gruuthuse and Jean de Ghistelles Sr. de Gistel & Harnes, Farum, Denmark.
 René, Duc d'Anjou (1480). Traité de la forme et devis comme on fait les tournois.
 De Almeida Lima, Marcelino (1922). Famílias faialenses: subsídios para a história da ilha do Faial. Horta: Tip. Minerva Insulana.

See also 
 Willem van der Haegen
 Josse van Huerter
 Jácome de Bruges
 Jean III d'Aa of Gruuthuse
 History of the Azores
 Tillegem Castle

Flemish nobility
Azorean nobility
1451 births
16th-century deaths

Year of death unknown
Portuguese people of Dutch descent